This is a list of Meritorious Service Medals (MSM) awarded in the 1918 New Year Honours.

The 1918 New Year Honours were appointments by King George V to various orders and honours to reward and highlight good works by citizens of the British Empire. The appointments were published in The London Gazette and The Times in January, February and March 1918.

Unlike the 1917 New Year Honours, the 1918 honours was dominated by rewards for war efforts. As The Times reported: "The New Year Honours represent largely the circumstances of war, and, perhaps, as usual, they also reflect human nature in an obvious form. The list is one of the rare opportunities for the public to scan the names of soldiers who have distinguished themselves in service."

Recipients of the Meritorious Service Medal (MSM)
Sister Eileen King, Queen Alexandra's Imperial Military Nursing Service (R.). For bravery and devotion to duty on the occasion of a hostile air raid on a casualty clearing station. Although wounded, she continued to give directions for the care of the wounded.

For gallantry in the performance of military duty —
Cpl. J. B. Leonard, Royal Irish Rifles
Sgt. W. H. Pollard, West Riding Reg. (Huddersfield)
Pte. H. B. Taylor, RAMC (Rochdale)

For valuable services rendered with the Armies in the Field during the present War —
Act. Staff Sergeant J. T. Claireaux, Army Ordnance Corps (Edinburgh)
Act. Sgt. C. Pledger, Royal Garrison Arty. (Buntingford)
Staff Sergeant J. Acland, Army Service Corps (East Dulwich)
Sgt. H. Abbott, Grenadier Guards (Battersea)
Sgt. A. Adams, RAMC (Netley)
Army Staff Sergeant W. H. Ahl, Army Ordnance Corps (Fulham)
Pte. J. G. A. Aiston, Army Service Corps (Watford)
Staff Sergeant E. Alexander, RAMC (Jersey)
Sgt. F. Allan, Royal Fusiliers (London)
Cpl. J. L. Allen, Army Ordnance Corps (Fulham)
Sgt. C. A. Alp, Lincolnshire Reg. (Leyton)
Sgt. J. Anderson, Army Ordnance Corps (Sunderland)
Pte. W. E. Anderson, Hussars (Headington Quarry, Oxford)
L. Sgt. W. Archer, Labour Corps (Lincoln)
Sgt. R. Armstrong, Royal Inniskilling Fusiliers (Irvinestown)
2nd Cpl. W. Armstrong, Royal Engineers (Hulme)
Cpl. A. Asher, Army Service Corps (Stoke Newington)
Sgt. J. H. Ashton, RAMC (Manchester)
Cpl. F. R. Ashwin, Royal Engineers (Old Brompton)
Sgt. N. Ashworth, RAMC (Bolton)
Sgt. T. Atherton, Royal Garrison Arty. (Burnley)
Sgt. W. J. Auker, Norfolk Reg. (King's Lynn)
Sgt. C. Austin, Royal West Kent Reg. (nr. Cardiff)
B.Q.M. Sgt. A. Axson, King's Own Scottish Borderers Dumfries)
B.Q.M. Sgt. F. Bailey, South Lancashire Reg. (Manchester)
Pte. A. L. Bale, Army Service Corps (Forest Gate)
2nd Cpl. W. A. Ballard, Royal Engineers (Southsea)
C.S. Maj. A. W. Bamber, Royal Engineers (Eastville)
Act. R.S. Maj. G. W. Banks, Middlesex Reg. (Staines)
C.S. Maj. G. T. Barber, Royal Engineers (Birmingham)
Cpl. J. E. Barber, Army Service Corps (Brighton)
Pte. E. H. Barfoot, Army Service Corps (New Cross)
Sgt. F. C. Barfoot, Royal Field Arty. (Portsmouth)
C.S. Maj. G. W. Barham, Royal Engineers (Leighton)
Pte. J. Barnard, Army Service Corps (Attleborough)
Battery Sergeant Major C. Barnes, Royal Garrison Arty. (Bristol)
Sgt. P. J. Barnes, Army Service Corps (Warwick)
L. Cpl. D. Barry, Military Mounted Police (Manchester)
Squadron Q.M.S. D. H. Bartlett, Army Service Corps (Roseberry Square, London)
Staff Sergeant J. G. Batten, RAMC (St. Helens)
Sgt. H. J. Baugh, Royal Garrison Arty. (Plymouth)
Sgt. C. Baughan, Army Service Corps (Bournemouth)
Cpl. W. R. Beale, Royal Engineers (York)
L. Cpl. R. H. Beaumont, Royal Engineers (Woking)
C.Q.M.S. A. J. Beckerleg, Army Service Corps (Willesden)
Sgt. Major D. J. D. Belford, RAMC (Dundee)
L. Cpl. D. Bell, Cameron Highlanders (Glasgow)
C.S. Maj. E. C. Bennett, Royal Engineers (Penzance)
Staff Sergeant Major C. W. Bennett, Army Service Corps (Fishergate)
Sgt. F. Bennett, Royal Field Arty. (Bristol)
Sgt. F. T. G. Bennett, Royal Field Arty. (Woolwich)
By/Sergeant Major N. S. Bennett, Royal Garrison Arty. (Southsea)
Sgt. Major S. Bennett, Military Mounted Police (Hoddesdon)
C.Q.M.S. F. Benson, Army Service Corps (Ayr)
L. Cpl. R. H. Bentley, Royal Engineers (Leicester)
Sgt. W. J. Benton, Machine Gun Corps (Ilford)
Squadron Q.M.S. C. E. Berbridge, Army Service Corps (Fulham)
Sgt. W. H. Bernard, Royal Fusiliers (Custom House, London)
L. Cpl. V. L. Berrie, Royal Engineers (Tooting)
Sgt. J. Berry (Andover)
Pte. J. E. Bettoney, Army Service Corps (Leicester)
Pte. H. J. Bevan, Royal Army Veterinary Corps (St. Pauls Cray)
Sgt. G. O'H. Beveridge, Military Mounted Police (Rathmines)
Pte. F. C. Biggs, Army Service Corps (Westbourne Pk.)
Q.M.S. J. W. Birch, Army Service Corps (Leeds)
Battery Sergeant Major F. Bishop, Royal Field Arty. (Plumstead)
Sgt. W. F. Blackburn, Royal Engineers (York)
Troop Sergeant Major J. Blackburn, Royal Engineers (Blackburn)
Cpl. F. W. Blackmore, Army Service Corps (Woolton)
Spr. R. Blakemore, Royal Engineers (Walthamstow)
Tmp R.S. Maj. W. Blackwood, Middlesex Reg. (Stoke Gabriel, near Totnes)
Conductor L. A. Blake, Royal Marines (South Shields)
Pte. E. Blenkhorn, Army Service Corps (Roundhay)
Staff Sergeant R. Boddy, RAMC (Cardiff)
Sgt. G. A. Booker, Royal Flying Corps (Wembley)
S/Q.M.S.ergeant H. Bolton, Army Service Corps (Manchester)
Staff Sergeant Major S. A. Bone, Yeomanry (Titmarsh)
Squadron Q.M.S. S. F. Bonner, Army Service Corps (Colchester)
Sgt. W. Bostock, Yeomanry (Teignmouth)
Staff Sergeant W. R. Bougourd, Army Ordnance Corps (Canning Town)
Sgt. W. Boughey, Royal Garrison Arty. (Skegby)
Sgt. E. S. Bourton, RAMC (Brixton)
Sgt. J. Bovill, Army Service Corps (Leyton)
Sgt. Major Foreman of Works J. Boyd, Royal Engineers (Fulwood)
B.Q.M. Sgt. J. W. Boyle, Gordon Highlanders (Port Glasgow)
Mechanic Sergeant Major J. Bradburn, Army Service Corps (E. Preston)
Far. Q.M.S. I. Brayton, Army Service Corps (Aldershot)
Sgt. Major J. Brett, RAMC (Plumstead)
L. Cpl. J. Brew, Machine Gun Corps (Belfast)
C.Q.M.S. R. J. Brewer, Machine Gun Corps (Tottenham)
Sgt. S. J. Brewrn, Leicestershire Reg. (Leicester)
L. Cpl. A. C. J. Bridges, Military Mounted Police (Tonbridge)
Pte. B. J. Brown, A.S.C. (Havant)
Battery Sergeant Major J. A. J. Brown, Royal Field Arty. (East Finchley)
Sgt. W. Brown, Royal Engineers (Edinburgh)
C.S. Maj. W. T. Brown, Army Service Corps (Hove)
Sgt. A. Buckingham, Royal Engineers (Plumstead)
Battery Sergeant Major F. J. Buckland, Royal Field Arty. (Exeter)
Q.M.S. A. Buckner, RAMC (Glasgow)
Conductor E. W. Buffee, Army Ordnance Corps (Whitley Bay)
R.S. Maj. T. H. Bull, Royal Field Arty. (E. Loughton)
Pte. P. A. Bullock, Army Service Corps (Forest Gate)
Staff Sergeant Major G. Bunch, Army Service Corps (Aldershot)
Reg.al Q.M.S. C. Bundock, Northumberland Fusiliers (Wood Green, London)
R.S. Maj. F. Burdett, Dragoon Guards (Birkenhead)
Staff Sergeant C. H. Burghart, Army Service Corps (Ferryhill)
Cpl. T. G. Burnard, Army Service Corps (Seaton)
Battery Sergeant Major F. Burt, Royal Garrison Arty. (Easton)
Sgt. R. Burton, Royal Engineers (E. Berwick)
Sgt. R. Burton, North Staffordshire Reg. (Cheltenham)
Cpl. R. Burton, Cameron Highlanders (Livingstone Station)
Tmp R.S. Maj. T. Burton, R. FA. (Harrogate)
Far. Sergeant G. N. R. Buehnell, Royal Field Arty. (Notting Hill, London)
Cpl. O. L. Butler, Army Service Corps (Birkenhead)
C.S. Maj. A. Bycroft, Army Service Corps (Liverpool)
Cpl. E. W. F. Cager, Royal Engineers (Brighton)
C.S. Maj. W. E. Calcott, Royal Engineers (Harrow)
Sgt. A. S. Camfield, Army Service Corps (Hepburn-on-Tyne)
L. Cpl. E. W. A. Campbell, Middlesex Reg. (East Ham)
C.S. Maj. J. Campbell, Army Service Corps (Lurgan)
Cpl. W. H. Campbell Army Service Corps (Burnley)
Sgt. Major J. B. Cantrell, RAMC (Warrington)
Bombr. H. Carley, Royal Garrison Arty. (Dover)
C.S. Maj. S. H. Carman, Royal Engineers (Islington)
Sgt. W. Carroll, Manchester Reg. (Oldham)
Cpl. G. W. Carter, Royal Flying Corps (Swindon)
L. Cpl. H. Carter, Army Ordnance Corps (Gillingham)
Pte. E. L. Cartwright, RAMC (Birmingham)
Sgt. J. Carver, Royal Engineers (Gateshead)
Act. Staff Sergeant C. L. Caswell, Army Ordnance Corps, attd. 67th Siege Battery, Royal Garrison Arty. (Taunton)
Sgt. W. W. Cater, Yorkshire Light Inf. (Ossett)
Sgt. A. L. Chadwick, Royal Field Arty. (Long-sight)
L. Cpl. A. E. Chare, Royal Engineers (Sutton Coldfield)
Pte. H. Charles worth, London Reg. (Huddersfield)
Gnr. C. E. Chick, Royal Garrison Arty. (Sunderland)
Fitter Sergeant G. E. Chirgwin, Royal Flying Corps (Streatham)
Sgt. A. E. Chisnall, Royal Engineers (Hindley Green)
Act. C.S. Maj. W. Christie, Royal Engineers (E. Chatham)
Sgt. J. T. Churchyard, Royal Field Arty. (Strand, London)
Bombr. G. S. Clapp, Royal Garrison Arty. (Poplar)
Act. R.S. Maj. F. J. Clark, East Lancashire Reg. (Plumstead)
Spr. J. P. Clark, Royal Engineers (Denton)
Dvr. A. L. Clarke, Army Service Corps (Grantham)
Bombr. C. E. Clarke, Royal Garrison Arty. (Torquay)
Sgt. J. H. Clarke, Manchester Reg. (Altrincham)
Sgt. Major F. A. Clements, Mil Prov. S. Corps (Fulham)
Squadron Q.M.S. C. W. Cliff, Army Service Corps (Wolverhampton)
Cpl. H. L. Clifford, Gloucestershire Reg. (Golden Valley)
C.S. Maj. A. Coates, Royal Engineers (Gainsborough)
Supt Clk Q.M.S. E. Coates, Rifle Brigade (Poole)
Pte. W. Cochrane, Royal Army Veterinary Corps
Q.M.S. J. A. Cockaday, Royal Garrison Arty. (Freshwater, Isle of Wight)
Sgt. F. Colclough, North Staffordshire Reg. (Fenton)
Spr. A. J. Cole, Royal Engineers (Biggleswade)
Gnr. F. E. Coleman, Royal Garrison Arty. (Fulham)
Pte. H. J. Colhna, Army Service Corps (Rye)
Staff Sergeant J. Collins, Army Ordnance Corps (Walworth)
C.S. Maj. W. Collins, Army Service Corps (Islington)
L. Cpl. H. A. Collison, Military Foot Police (Middlesbro)
Sgt. A. J. Cook, Army Service Corps (Manor Park, London)
Sgt. A. J. Cook, Royal Flying Corps (Newcastle upon Tyne)
B.Q.M. Sgt. H. Cooke, Grenadier Guards (Northampton)
Pte. W. J. Cooke, Army Service Corps (E. Woolwich)
Pte. T. B. W. Cookson, Army Service Corps (Battersea)
Cpl. C. E. Cooper, Rifle Brigade (Bexley Heath)
Spr. J. E. Connolly, Royal Engineers (nr Crump, sail)
Pte. T. Connolly, Royal Irish Reg. (Edinburgh)
Sgt. T. Corless, Army Service Corps (Blackpool)
Spr. T. Cosher, Royal Engineers (Barry, Wales)
C.S. Maj. J. T. Coverley, Royal Engineers (Chesterfield)
Pte. W. Cowell, Liverpool Reg. (Douglas, Isle of M)
Pte. H. W. G. Cox, East Kent Reg. (Ashford, Middlesex)
J. H. Cox, Army Service Corps (Gosport)
Pte. Machine Gun L. Cox, Army Service Corps (Leigh)
Spr. J. Cracknell, Royal Engineers (Whitstorie)
Pte. A. J. Crisp, Duke of Cornwall's Light Inf., attd. Inf. Brigade (Westminster)
Spr. W. Cromarty, Royal Engineers (Newcastle upon Tyne)
Staff Sergeant Foreman of Works H. G. Croot, Royal Engineers (Mutley)
Sgt. F. Crosby, Army Service Corps (Langham)
Sgt. F. T. Croxford, Labour Corps (Maidenhead, Berks.)
Sgt. H. A. Cruxton, Army Service Corps (Birmingham)
Supt Clerk W. Cullen, Royal Berkshire Reg. (Aughnacloy, County Tyrone)
Sgt. T. Cummins, Royal Flying Corps (Bristol)
Sgt. J. A. Cundy, Royal Flying Corps (St. Johns Wood)
Sgt. W. Currie, Royal Garrison Arty. (Harrogate)
Spr. H. L. Curtis, Royal Engineers (Tufnell Park, London)
RQM Sergeant F. Dale, Royal Lancaster Reg. (Plumstead)
Q.M.S. W. H. Daniels, RAMC (Linthorpe)
Staff Sergeant S. J. Daly, Army Service Corps (Jersey  Army Service Corps (Pimlico)
C.Q.M.S. F. Owen, Royal Engineers (Chatham)
R.S. Maj. S. Oxford, Dragoons (Felixstowe)
Staff Sergeant A. Padget, Army Service Corps (Wakefield)
Sgt. G. T. Palmer, Royal Engineers (Beaumaris)
Mechanist Staff Sergeant J. W. Paltridge, Army Service Corps (Plymouth)
Pte. C. V. Parker, Army Service Corps (Brighton)
Sgt. J. Parker, Army Service Corps (Braintree)
Staff Sergeant J. Parr, RAMC (St. Helens)
Cpl. W. E. Patterson, Army Service Corps (Cork)
Sgt. A. Pattison, RAMC (Sheffield)
Sgt. S. A. Payne, Royal Engineers (Bootle)
Pte. A. H. Peacock, Army Service Corps (now Royal Fusiliers) (E. Woolwich)
Armament Q.M.S. F. E. Peake, Army Ordnance Corps (Woolwich)
Battery Sergeant Major J. Pearoe, Royal Field Arty. (Stoke-on-Trent)
Staff Sergeant A. Pearson, RAMC (Swmton)
C.Q.M.S. J. H. Pearson, Cheshire Reg. (Stockport)
R.S. Maj. A. Peasgood, Lincolnshire Reg. (Stamford)
Staff Sergeant Major C. G. Pedder, Army Service Corps (Beckenham)
Battery Sergeant Major G. J. Penn, Royal Field Arty. (Tooting)
C.S. Maj. A. Penny, Royal Engineers (E. Cork)
Pte. H. T. Penny, London Reg. (W. Baling)
C.S. Maj. J. Penwarden, Royal Engineers (Cheriton)
B.Q.M. Sgt. T. W. Percivall, London Reg. (Wood Green)
Act. Sgt. E. D. Petter, Royal Garrison Arty. (West Wittering)
Sgt. T. Pettigrew, Labour Corps (Paisley)
Q.M.S. F. A. Philbrook, RAMC (Colchester)
Sgt. E. J. Phillips, Royal Engineers (E. Swindon)
Staff Sergeant H. S. Phillpott, Army Ordnance Corps (Ilford)
Gnr. B. Pick, Royal Garrison Arty. (Chopwell)
Sgt. C. Pipe, North Lancashire Reg. (Bungay)
Cpl. J. Pirie, Gordon Highlanders (Airdrie)
C.S. Maj. H. Placey, A. G. Staff (Henley-on-Thames)
Pte. A. H. Pollaid, Army Service Corps (Leicester)
Sgt. E. C. Pope, Rifle Brigade (Southampton)
Cpl. E. W. Pople, Royal Engineers (Burnham)
C.Q.M.S. F. G. Pook, Machine Gun Corps (Upper Tooting, London)
Sgt. P. J. Pook, RAMC (Sidcup)
L. Cpl. D. G. S. Porter, Military Foot Police, attd. Military Mounted Police (Aldershot)
Q.M.S. T. H. Potter, RAMC (Tuebrook, Liverpool)
Sgt. H. H. Pottinger, Nottinghamshire and Derbyshire Reg. (Nottingham)
Act. Company, Sergeant Major R. Prance, A. G. Staff (Bideford)
L. Cpl. A. L. Pratt, Army Service Corps (Nuneaton)
C.S. Maj. F. J. Pratt, Royal Engineers (Ipswich)
Sgt. L. A. Pratt, RAMC (Kirtlington)
Sgt. A. N. Preston, Army Service Corps (Newcastle upon Tyne)
Sgt. W. H. Preston, Royal Fusiliers (Wimbledon)
Staff Sergeant Major J. A. Pringle, Army Service Corps (Maryport)
Sgt. W. Pringle, Royal Army Veterinary Corps (Newmarket)
Petty Ofc. W. Punton, Royal Naval Volunteer Reserve (Pelaw-on-Tyne)
Squadron Q.M.S. G. E. Pyne, Army Service Corps (Conways Cross, County Sligo)
Fitter Sergeant F. Ramsav, Royal Flying Corps (Snaith)
C.Q.M.S. A. G. Randall, Royal Engineers (Walthamstow)
Cpl. J. O. Handle, RAMC (Leicester)
Battery Sergeant Major A. G. Rae, Royal Garrison Arty. (Ditton)
Cpl. T. W. Rea, Army Service Corps (Spittal)
Battery Sergeant Major W. Read, Royal Field Arty. (Ipswich)
Sgt. H. Rekes, Army Service Corps (Aldershot)
Sgt. T. J. Rees, Royal Engineers (West Ham)
Staff Sergeant Major W. R. Rees, Army Service Corps (Crawthorne)
Dvr. H. Render, Royal Garrison Arty. (Middleham)
Squadron Q.M.S. G. Richardson, Army Service Corps (Shotley Bridge)
Sgt. J. Richardson, Northumberland Fusiliers (Tyne Dock)
Sgt. Major S. Richmond, Army Service Corps (Shoreham-by-Sea)
Cpl. T. S. Rickard, Army Service Corps (Tottenham)
Sgt. T. W. Rider, Middlesex Reg. (Hoxton)
Sgt. A. E. Ridley, Royal Engineers (Regents Park, London)
Cpl. J. Ripley, Royal Engineers (Leeds)
Sgt. J. H. Roberts, London Reg. (Anerley, London)
Mechanic Sergeant Major W. Robertson, Army Service Corps (Hampstead)
Sgt. C. Robinson, Army Service Corps (Farnborough)
L. Cpl. J. Robson, Royal Engineers (High Haworth)
C.S. Maj. W. Robson, Gordon Highlanders (Glasgow)
2nd Cpl. L. J. Rogers, Royal Engineers (Tottenham)
Sgt. A. Roper, Dorsetshire Reg. (Arne)
B.Q.M. Sgt. H. Rose, London Reg. (Forest Hill, London)
Sgt. W. R. Rose, Machine Gun Corps (Birmingham)
1st Class Staff Sergeant Major T. Rowan, Army Service Corps (Limerick)
Cpl. B. H. Russell, Liverpool Reg. (New Brighton)
Staff Sergeant A. J. Ryan, Army Service Corps (Saffron Walden)
L. Cpl. T. Ryan, Royal Engineers (Patricroft)
Sgt. J. Salter, Army Ordnance Corps (Pawlett)
Sgt. A. W. A. L. Sample, Royal Engineers (York)
C.Q.M.S. Sergeant J. Samuels, Royal Engineers (Ashton-on-Mersey)
Dvr. E. Sandroff, Army Service Corps (Homerton)
Mechanist Staff Sergeant D. W. Sarbutt, Army Service Corps (Ipswich)
Sgt. R. H. Sarginson, Royal Fusiliers (West Hartlepool)
C.S. Maj. C. Saunders, Labour Corps (Lattlehampton)
Sgt. C. S. Saunders, Royal Engineers (Fulham, London)
L. Cpl. W, Saville, Royal Engineers (Thorpe, Leeds)
Q.M.S. C. A. Scarbrow, RAMC (Banwell)
Cpl. W. Scobie, Royal Highlanders (Blackford)
Cpl. A. Scott, Royal Engineers (Tranent)
Cpl. J. Scott, Royal Engineers (Newcastle)
Tmp M.S. M. H. Schofield, Army Service Corps (E. Colchester)
Tmp Sub-Condr J. Sedgwick, Army Ordnance Corps (Howgill)
Sgt. H. W. Selden, RAMC (Lincoln)
Sqn. Cpl. Major R. Sensier, Life Guards (Ascot)
Act. Cpl. J. Sewell, Labour Corps (late Royal Fusiliers) (Canning Town, London)
Staff Sergeant Major W. Sewell, North Irish Horse (Dublin)
Sgt. C. J. Sharp, Royal Engineers (Aldershot)
Sgt. J. Sharp, York & Lancaster Reg. (Haigh, near Barnsley) London
1st Writer L. E. Sharp, Royal Naval Volunteer Reserve (Brixton)
Sgt. R. Sharp, Royal Engineers (Taunton)
C.S. Maj. W. A. Sharpe, Royal Engineers (Wandsworth)
L. Cpl. A. Shaw, Royal Lancaster Reg. (Bowerham)
B.Q.M. Sgt. J. Shepherd, Royal Warwickshire Reg. (Coventry)
Cpl. S. Shield, Army Ordnance Corps (Liverpool)
Sgt. S. H. Shinton, South Staffordshire Reg. (Wolverhampton)
Pte. F. W. Shorney, Army Service Corps (Neath)
Staff Sergeant F. V. Sibbald, Army Service Corps (Cork)
Staff Sergeant Major T.F . Siddle, Army Service Corps (Elswick)
Mechanic Staff Sergeant D. Silverstone, Army Service Corps (Leyton)
Squadron Q.M.S. W. Silvester, Royal Engineers (Portsmouth)
Pte. J. J. Simmons, Army Service Corps (Kingstown, County Dublin)
R.S. Maj. W. E. Simmons, Royal Field Arty. (Sheffield)
Sgt. J. Slater, Royal Garrison Arty. (Southsea)
Sgt. H. Sleigh, Army Service Corps (Walsall)
C.S. Maj. A. Smith, Army Service Corps (Stratford)
Sgt. A. Smith, London Reg. (Rotherhithe)
Sgt. D. W. Smith, Northumberland Fusiliers (Aberdeen)
B.Q.M. Sgt. F. Smith, Royal Field Arty. (Walton-on-Thames)
Pte. H. P. Smith, Army Service Corps (Twickenham)
Dvr. J. Smith, Army Service Corps (Shepherd's Bush)
Staff Sergeant Major Sup Clk R. Smith, Middlesex Reg. (West Baling)
Sgt. R. A. Smith, Royal Engineers CPaisley)
Sgt. W. Smith, Northumberland Fusiliers (Hull)
C.S. Maj. J. Smoothey, Machine Gun Corps (Rochford)
Act. Sgt. Major W. J. Smyrk, Royal Flying Corps (Islington)
Far. Q.M.S. J. C. Sobey, Dragoon Guards (Hornsey)
Squadron Q.M.S. E. N. Soilleux, Army Service Corps (Whitstable)
Sgt. Royal Arty. Sparling, York & Lancaster Reg. (Sheffield)
C.S. Maj. W. J. Speller, Royal Engineers (Maidenhead)
L. Cpl. A. Spmks, South Lancashire Reg. (Warrington)
Cpl. A. J. Spry, Royal Marine Light Inf. (Landulpa)
Sgt. W. D. Stafford, Royal Fusiliers (Pietermaritzburg)
Tmp Sub Conductor F. G. Stagg, Army Ordnance Corps (Portsmouth)
Sgt. H. Standen, Military Mounted Police (Wanrkworth)
Sgt. W. A. Stephens, Army Service Corps (Cloughfold)
Squadron Q.M.S. J. Stephenson, Army Service Corps (Gateshead)
Sgt. B. Stoddart Durham Light Inf. (Barnard Castle)
Cpl. A. J. Stokes, Royal Garrison Arty. (Poole)
Cpl. A. Stone, Army Ordnance Corps (Erith)
Sgt. A. Strain, Royal Engineers (Alexandria, N.B.)
Conductor J. Strange, Army Ordnance Corps (St. Heliers, Jersey)
Sgt. A. T. Strivens, Army Service Corps (East Ham)
Superindending Clerk G. T. Stroud, Royal Engineers (Gillingham)
2nd Cpl. G. D. Sutton, Royal Engineers (Northwich)
Fitter Sergeant W. H. Sweeting, Royal Flying Corps (Cirencester)
Sgt. W. Sylvester, Army Service Corps (Brownhills)
1st Class Staff Sergeant Major T. A. Taoey, Army Service Corps (Barnsbury)
Sgt. A. Tannahill, Northumberland Fusiliers (Gateshead)
Cpl. E. C. Tansley, RAMC (Coventry) 
Sup. Clerk H. Targett, Royal Engineers (Houghton)
Sgt. C. A. Taylor, Royal Engineers (Farnham)
Conductor E. H. Taylor, Army Ordnance Corps (St. George's, Bermuda)
Sgt. F. W. D. Taylor, Army Service Corps (Weeley)
Act. Sgt. H. D. Taylor, Royal Engineers (Brackley)
Tmp Sergeant Major H. W. Taylor, Royal Engineers (Gillingham)
Sgt. T. Taylor, Machine Gun Corps (Leominster)
Sgt. W. L. Taylor, Army Service Corps (Nunhead)
Sgt. F. W. Toake, Royal Garrison Arty. (Tatterham)
Sgt. T. Thomas, Royal Berkshire Reg. (Briton, Ferry, Glamorgan)
Sgt. W. Thomasson, Shropshire Light Inf. (Bolton, Lancaster)
Sgt. Major A. Thompson, RAMC (Manchester)
C.Q.M.S. P. Thompson, Machine Gun Corpsr (Knottingley)
Cpl. W. F. B. Thompson, Labour Corps (Kensal Rise)
L. Cpl. J. Mel Thomson, Royal Engineers (Newcastle upon Tyne)
Act. Sgt. J. Thornhill, Labour Corps (Customs House)
Sgt. T. Thornly, Royal Army Veterinary Corps (Colchester)
C.S. Maj. R. Tildesley, Army Service Corps (Willenhall)
Bombr. C. W. Tilt, Royal Garrison Arty. (Browsgrove)
Pte. A. W. Tippitts, Army Service Corps, attd. Labour Company, now Royal Engineers (E. Woolwich)
Act. Staff Sergeant A. Tomkins, Army Ordnance Corps (Portslade)
C.Q.M.S. W. Trappett, Royal Engineers (Curragh)
Staff Sergeant V. Tnppv RAMC (Clapton)
Sup Clerk Sergeant Major M. Trippas, Rifle Brigade Mold)
Squadron Q.M.S. C. H. Tuke, Army Service Corps (Lichfield)
Sgt. A. N. Turner, Army Service Corps (Whitstable)
Act. Sgt. H. Turner, A.G. Staff (Norwich)
C.Q.M.S. J. Turner, Manchester Reg. (Bradford)
C.S. Maj. J. Turner, Royal Engineers (Gillingham)
Sgt. W. J. Turner, RAMC (Lurgan, County Armagh)
Cpl. F. Tustin, Royal Engineers (Hither Green)
Cpl. V. V. J. Unmey, Army Ordnance Corps (Lower Monkstown, County Cork)
Bombr. R. Underwood, Royal Garrison Arty. (Kildare)
Sgt. G. Utley, Royal Garrison Arty. (York)
Sgt. A. Valentine, Royal Garrison Arty. (Leeds)
Battery Sergeant Major L. W. Venables, Royal Garrison Arty. (Saltby)
R.S. Maj. J. Vevers, Royal Field Arty. (Chapel-en-le-Frith)
Pte. J. Vincent, Army Service Corps (now Labour Corps) (E. Woolwich)
R.S. Maj. A. Vian, Royal Field Arty. (South Norwood)
L. Cpl. W. H. Waddell, MF P. (Corby)
C.S. Maj. Arty. Clerk E. B. Wager, Royal Garrison Arty. (Wellingborough)
Sgt. J. Wainwright, Royal Flying Corps (Caledonian Road, London)
Sgt. W. J. Wainwright, Royal Engineers (Smallthorne)
C.Q.M.S. F. C. Walker, Highland Light Inf. (Tuffnel Park)
Act. Staff Sergeant J. Walker, Army Ordnance Corps (Halifax)
Pte. R. W. Walker, Army Ordnance Corps (Pembroke Dock)
Cpl. E. E. Wallace, Royal Engineers (Bury St. Edmunds)
Mechanic Staff Sergeant P. Walmsley, Army Service Corps (Bolton)
Pte. C. E. Walter, Army Service Corps (Woolwich)
Squadron Q.M.S. J. Walthew, Army Service Corps (Middlesbro)
Sgt. Major A. J. Warburton, Royal Army Veterinary Corps (Bradford)
Pte. F. Ward, Army Service Corps (Manchester)
Cpl. W. H. Ward, Duke of Cornwall's Light Inf. (Bude)
Cpl. F. C. Warden, RAMC (Derby)
Act. C.Q.M.S. S. L. Wareham, Royal Warwickshire Reg. (Birmingham)
Pte. J. Waters, RAMC (Tyldesley)
Cpl. A. Watson, Army Service Corps (Boroughbridge)
Sgt. T. Watson, Royal Garrison Arty. (Warrington)
Sgt. H. Webb, Royal Flying Corps (Finsbury Park, London)
Fitter Sergeant T. O. Webber, Royal Flying Corps (Hawkhurst)
C. G. Webster, Royal Field Arty. (East Ham)
Sgt. N. F. Webster, West Yorkshire Reg.(Leeds)
Cpl. A. Weeks, Royal Engineers (Dublin)
Staff Sergeant Major B. G. Weiss, Army Service Corps (Salisbury)
Air Mechanic, 1st Class J. G. Weldon, Royal Flying Corps (Sefton Park)
R.S. Maj. G. H. Weller, Royal Engineers (Newark)
Sgt. A. Wells, Royal West Kent Reg. (Hawkhnrstt
Tmp Staff Sergeant Major D. Wells, Army Service Corps (Folkestone)
Sgt. H. O. Welsh, Durham Light Inf. (Gateshead)
Q.M.S. T. Wheway, RAMC (Leicester)
Sgt. W. Whiston, Middlesex Reg. (Hanley, Staffs.)
Fitter Sergeant E. E. White, Royal Flying Corps (Camberley)
Q.M.S. H. White, RAMC (Waisail)
Sgt. J. White, Royal Engineers (Willesden)
Pte. W. White, Dragoon Guards (Wickford)
Cpl. W. H. C. White, Gloucestershire Reg. (Bristol)
Staff Sergeant L. J. Whitehorn, Royal Engineers (Clapham, London)
Sgt. J. W. Whitehouse, Army Service Corps (Tipton)
Sgt. L. Whiteley, Army Service Corps (E. Liverpool)
C.S. Maj. F. H. Whitfield, Oxfordshire & Buckinghamshire Light Inf. (South Tottenham)
Cpl. W. Wignall, RAMC (Liverpool)
Sgt. Major Superintendent Clerk W. Wilcock, Royal Engineers (E. Bristol)
Armament Q.M.S. J. Wilkinson, Army Ordnance Corps (Fleet)
Staff Sergeantmith T. Wilkinson, Royal Engineers (Fermoy)
Cpl. W. E. Willcockson, Labour Corps (Kingsland Road, London)
Squadron Q.M.S. F. A. Williams, Army Service Corps (Altrincham)
L. Cpl. G. Williams, Military Mounted Police (Richmond)
Sgt. W. G. Willis, Royal Flying Corps (Bristol)
Pte. W. J. Willis, Army Service Corps (Swindon)
Act. Sgt. Major A. H. Willson, Army Ordnance Corps (Penge)
Tmp Sub Conductor T. Wilson, Army Ordnance Corps (Plumstead)
Q.M.S. W. Wisdom, Royal Engineers (Shepherd's Bush)
Pte. A. L. Witts, Army Service Corps (Worcester)
Sgt. W. Wonfor, Labour Corps (Surbiton)
Sgt. E. J. Wood, Military Mounted Police (Taplow)
Act. Staff Sergeant T. W. Wood, Army Ordnance Corps (Stafford)
Sgt. J. Woodcock, Royal Field Arty. (South Shields)
Sgt. A. Woods, Labour Corps (Lytham, Lancaster)
Q.M.S. J. A. I. Woods, South Wales Borderers (Diss)
R.S. Maj. A. Worsfold, Royal Field Arty. (Winsford)
Far. Staff Sergeant A. A. Wright, R. M. (New Cross, London)
Gnr. J. Wright, Royal Garrison Arty. (Lincoln)
Pte. J. Wright, Royal Army Veterinary Corps (West Lynn)
Sgt. J. Wright, Royal Scots (Edinburgh)
Sgt. W. L. R. Wright, Royal Army Veterinary Corps (Manchester)
Pte. G. H. Wrigglesworth, East Yorkshire Reg. (E. York)
Sgt. J. R. Yarrow, Royal Garrison Arty. (Shoeburyness)
Q.M.S. S. W. Yardley, Royal Engineers (Moulton)
C.S. Maj. H. Yarnall, Army Service Corps (Leicester)
B.Q.M. Sgt. H. Yates, King's Royal Rifle Corps (Wolverhampton)
C.S. Maj. W. C. Yealand, Nottinghamshire and Derbyshire Reg. (Nottingham)
C.Q.M.S. A. J. Young, Royal Engineers (Hulme)
Pte. P. A. Young, Army Service Corps (Lewisham)
Sgt. V. L. Young, Royal Engineers (Chatham)
Pte. D. Smyth, Royal Irish Rifles (Dromore)
Pte. H. Clarke, Army Service Corps (Whitchurch)

Australian Imperial Force
Sgt. P. de M. Abbott, Army Medical Corps
2nd Cpl. C. P. Atkins, Engineers
Sgt. H. C. Behaun, Army Medical Corps
Sgt. L. K. Bridge, Inf.
Sgt. W. A. Bryant, Inf.
Able Seamanattery Q.M.S. P. S. Game, Inf.
Sgt. W. H. H. Carpenter, Army Service Corps
Sgt. W. C. Cheesenian, Light Trench Mortar Battery
Warrant Ofc. Artr. F. N. Conradi, Army Ordnance Corps
Warrant Ofc. 1st Class, W. C. Copperthwaite, Inf.
Warrant Ofc. J. M. Davis, Division HQ Clerical Staff
Sgt. H. O. S. Drew, Inf.
Sgt. D. J. Duggan, Field Arty. Brigade
Sgt. F. F. Eddie, Army Medical Corps
Warrant Ofc. S. E. Emms, Army Medical Corps
Sgt. C. Evans, Inf.
Sgt. J. Flackfield, Engineers
2nd Cpl. J. D. Fletcher, Engineers
Sgt. A. H. Fortescue, Army Service Corps
Warrant Ofc. G. W. Fulton, AHQ Clerical Staff
Warrant Ofc. J. T. Goodhall, Army Medical Corps
Sgt. H. C. Hopkins, Inf.
C.Q.M.S. C. H. Howitt, Inf.
Staff Sergeant R. L. Kennedy, Army Medical Corps
Staff Sergeant W. H. S. Kerr, Anzac Prov. Corps
Warrant Ofc. 1st Class, L. L. Lethlean, Engineers
Cpl. S. F. E. Liebert, Engineers
L. Cpl. W. G. Lincoln, Cyclist Battalion
Staff Sergeant E. A. Lockhart, Inf.
Warrant Ofc. G. N. Mackie, Inf.
Pte. T. W. Martin, Inf.
Dvr. W. P. Martin, Engineers
B.Q.M. Sgt. J. J. McCredie, Army Ordnance Corps
Staff Sergeant D. McNaught, Royal Army Veterinary Corps
Sgt. W. H. Millar, Engineers
Cpl. N. G. Mills, Engineers
C.Q.M.S. O. T. Mills, Inf.
Staff Sergeant G. L. Morris, Inf.
B.Q.M. Sgt. R. A. Murdoch, Inf.
Sgt. G. Patrick, Engineers
Tmp Warrant Ofc. H. L. Peck, Royal Army Pay Corps
Warrant Ofc. W. Poole, Army Medical Corps
L. Cpl. J. H. Powell, Inf.
Staff Sergeant E. P. Prendergast, Inf.
L. Cpl. J. W. Quarrie, Army Service Corps
Warrant Ofc. F. C. Roberts, Army Medical Corps
Cpl. A. Sinclair, Engineers
Sgt. D. R. Smith, Anzac Hqrs
R.S. Maj. E. E. Solley, Clerical Staff, HQ
C.S. Maj. J. H. Steer, Engineers
Cpl. J. S. Stevenson, Inf.
Tmp Warrant Ofc. S. J. Stott, HQ
C.Q.M.S. C. R. Stubbs, Army Service Corps
Sgt. H. C. G. Thurlow, Engineers
B.Q.M. Sgt. F. G. Turner, Inf.
C.S. Maj. /C. J. Vause, Engineers
Conductor T. D. Watson, Army Ordnance Corps
Tmp Conductor M. C. Welch, Army Ordnance Corps
B.Q.M. Sgt. A. W. T. White, Pioneer Battalion
Staff Sergeant Major T. C. Wilkinson, Anzac Prov. Corps
Sgt. J. R. Wilson, Inf.
Warrant Ofc. A. F. Woollard, Engineers
Sgt. H. F. Young, Inf.

Canadian Force
Sgt. A. J. Addy, Canadian Railway Troops
Sgt. H. P. Allberry, Inf.
Sgt. R. F. Allen, Engineers
Sgt. H. A. Buckle, Inf.
Sgt. W. H. Charlesworth, Canadian Railway Troops
Sgt. D. Collins, Canadian Railway Troops
Sgt. J. Craddock, Pioneer Battalion
Sgt. Major E. B. Davies, Inf.
Sgt. J. C. H. Davies, Engineers
Cpl. H. W. Dawes, Canadian Sub-Staff, late Machine Gun Corps
Sgt. W. H. Dean, Canadian Railway Troops
Staff Sergeant R. Drummond, Army Service Corps
Sgt. J. Duckworth, Inf.
Act. Q.M.S. H. W. Dunk, Ordance Corps
Sgt. Major P. G. Fairbrother, Cav.
Sgt. Major J. Farmer, Canadian Sub Staff
Sgt. W. H. Foote, Inf.
Cpl. H. H. Goodall, Inf.
Act. Sgt. Major S. W. Graham, Ordnance Corps
Act. Cpl. J. Grier, Inf.
Sgt. J. Harper, Inf.
Staff Sergeant G. A. Harris, Army Service Corps
Battery Sergeant Major E. Hineson, Arty.
Q.M.S. H. G. Iliffe, Canadian Sub-Staff
Staff Sergeant W. A. Jeffs, Cyclist Corps
Pte. W. Johnson, Canadian Sub-Staff
Cpl. C. Kennedy, Rly Troops
Sgt. D. King, Canadian Railway Troops
Sgt. Major C. E. Lamb, Canadian Sub-Staff
Cpl. J. G. MacGregor, Labour Battalion
Pte. W. M. MacLean, Canadian Railway Troops
Cpl. R. McDonald, Canadian Railway Troops
Act. Sgt. J. H. McKenzie, Canadian Forestry Corps
Staff Sergeant J. Milroy, attd. Canadian General Base Depot
Sgt. G. Morgan, Inf.
Pte. L. G. Mounoe, Canadian Forestry Corps
Cpl. D. R. Murray, Inf.
Staff Sergeant H. Prior, Canadian Sub-Staff
Staff Sergeant A. E. Ross, Army Service Corps
Cpl. M. E. Rugg, Army Service Corps
Sgt. K. S. Russell, Inf.
Gnr. L. A. Shaver, Division Arty.
C.S. Maj. W. R. Spencer, Engineers
Q.M.S. D. H. Strutt, Inf.
Staff Sergeant G. H. Taylor, Army Medical Corps
Q.M.S. A. E. Tomlin, Canadian Sub-Staff
Sgt. T. M. Turner, Inf.
Staff Sergeant R. Webber, Canadian Railway Troops
Battery Sergeant Major J. Whitts, Field Arty.

New Zealand Force
Sgt. D. Cameron, Pioneers
Sgt. S. S. Choate, Clerical Staff
B.Q.M. Sgt. E. S. Colebrook, Rifle Brigade
L. Cpl. S. V. Forrest, Auckland Reg.
Sgt. G. H. Griffin, Wellington Reg.
C.S. Maj. A. H. Guy, Canterbury Reg.
Sgt. R. E. Hunt, Rifle Brigade
Sgt. T. Jones, Auckland Reg.
C.S. Maj. T. Kenna, Engineers
Pte. J. G. Langrish, Rifle Brigade
Staff Sergeant Major G. E. Lovell, Canterbury Reg.
L. Cpl. J. Mercer, Rifle Brigade
Staff Sergeant G. R. Robinson, New Zealand Medical Corps
Cpl. L. Shaw, Rifle Brigade
L. Cpl. T. Smith, Rifle Brigade
Staff Sergeant H. L. Walden, Postal Service

South African Force
Dvr. J. Bryant, Army Service Corps
Dvr. C. N. Gabriel, Army Service Corps
Dvr. P. G. Locker, Army Service Corps
Sgt. C. McPherson, Inf.
Sgt. H. Ritchie, Signal Company, Engineers
Sgt. C. H. V. Sowden, Engineers

Indian Army
Staff Sergeant J. R. Howey, Indian Miscellaneous List, attd. Indian Sec., General Headquarters
Cond. E. V. Johnson, Indian Ordn. Dept.
Far. Staff Sergeant S. Mills, Indian Subordnance Veterinary Dept.
Sub Conductor E. T. Walsh, Supply and Transport Corps, attd. Lucknow CCS
Staff Sergeant J. E. Walsh, Indian Miscellaneous List

See also
1918 New Year Honours - Full list of awards.

References

New Year Honours
1918 awards
1918 in Australia
1918 in Canada
1918 in India
1918 in New Zealand
1918 in the United Kingdom